Louriston (also Lorriston) is an unincorporated community in Louriston Township, Chippewa County, Minnesota, United States.

Notes

Unincorporated communities in Chippewa County, Minnesota
Unincorporated communities in Minnesota